Reighard may refer to:

People:
Jacob Ellsworth Reighard (1861-1942), American zoologist

Other:
12529 Reighard, a minor planet discovered in 1998